Julian Charles Roland Hunt, Baron Hunt of Chesterton  (born 5 September 1941) is a British meteorologist who was Director General and Chief Executive of the British Meteorological Office from 1992 to 1997. He was made a Life peer of the Labour Party by Tony Blair in 2000 where he sat until 30th October 2021. He was the leader on the Labour group of Cambridge City Council in the 1970s.

Life
Hunt is the son of diplomat Roland Hunt and Pauline Garnett. The Hunt family were goldsmiths and silversmiths in the eighteenth and nineteenth centuries; John Samuel Hunt (1785–1865) being in business with his uncle-by-marriage, Paul Storr; also descended from John Samuel Hunt was John Hunt, Baron Hunt of Fawley.

Hunt is Professor of Climate modelling in the Department of Space and Climate Physics and Department of Earth Sciences at University College London.

Hunt was educated at Westminster School and went on to study Mechanical Sciences at Trinity College, Cambridge, where he is now a fellow, and gained a first class honours degree in 1963. In 1967 he was awarded a PhD on Aspects of Magnetohydrodynamics from Cambridge. In 1989, he was elected a Fellow of the Royal Society.

Hunt was created a life peer as Baron Hunt of Chesterton, Chesterton in the County of Cambridgeshire on 5 May 2000. He is the father of historian and former Member of Parliament for Stoke-on-Trent Central, Tristram Hunt, medical doctor Matilda and journalist and novelist Jemima Hunt. Hunt is the great-nephew of noted meteorologist Lewis Fry Richardson.

Meteorological Office
He followed Sir John Houghton as Director-General and Chief Executive of the Meteorological Office in 1992, consequently being elected to the Executive Committee of the World Meteorological Organisation. In 1997 he left the Met Office and was replaced by Peter Ewins.

In recent years he has warned that the pattern of Asian monsoons could be fundamentally altered unless there is a concerted effort to check greenhouse gas emissions in the area. He is chairman of Cambridge Environmental Research Consultants Ltd.

References

External links 

 Julian Hunt | UK Parliament
 Julian Hunt | Royal Society
 Julian Hunt | The Guardian
 Interviewed by Alan Macfarlane 1 May and 3 June 2009 (video)

1941 births
Living people
British climatologists
British meteorologists
Companions of the Order of the Bath
Hunt of Chesterton
Fellows of the Royal Society
Fellows of Trinity College, Cambridge
Academics of University College London
People educated at Westminster School, London
Alumni of Trinity College, Cambridge
People from Chesterton, Cambridge
Life peers created by Elizabeth II